Serhiy Petrovych Kulchytsky (17 December 1963 – 29 May 2014) was head of the military and special training directorate at the National Guard of Ukraine. Gen Kulchytsky was killed during the Siege of Sloviansk, when his helicopter was downed by armed pro-Russian separatists.

Military career 
Serhiy Kulchytsky had a military upbringing. His father served with Soviet forces stationed in East Germany. He went on to train at the Far Eastern Higher Military Command School in the city of Blagoveshchensk, attaining a distinction in 1985. His military career began with the role of marine platoon commander at the Soviet Northern Fleet, based in Murmansk. Kulchytsky served in the Soviet Northern Fleet until the dissolution of the Union. Once Ukraine became an independent state, Kulchytsky moved to western Ukraine and became deputy commander of a National Guard battalion in Ternopil in 1992. Moving up the ranks, he became the battalion's commander in 1994. In 2010 he was appointed deputy commander of the Western Command of the Ukrainian Interior Ministry's troops by President Viktor Yanukovych.

Death 
Kulchytsky was travelling with soldiers to the Mount Karachun base near Sloviansk when their MI-8 helicopter was shot down by pro-Russian separatists armed with anti-aircraft weapons. The Major-General, six other National Guardsmen, and six special forces of the Interior Ministry were all killed. At the time, he was the highest-ranking officer to be killed in action.

Funeral 
Kulchytsky's funeral procession took place on 31 May, in the western city of Lviv at the Lychakiv Cemetery.

Legacy 
Ukrainian president Petro Poroshenko congratulated the 27th Brigade of the National Guard with the title of the "Serhiy Kulchytsky Battalion", after Kulchytsky.

Personal life 
Kulchytsky was married with a son.

References 

1963 births
2014 deaths
People from Weimar
People from Thuringia
Ukrainian military personnel of the war in Donbas
Ukrainian military personnel killed in the Russo-Ukrainian War
Major generals of Ukraine
Victims of aviation accidents or incidents in Ukraine
Victims of helicopter accidents or incidents
Recipients of the Order of Bohdan Khmelnytsky, 3rd class
Recipients of the Order of Gold Star (Ukraine)
Military personnel killed in war in Donbas
Burials at Lychakiv Cemetery
Far Eastern Higher Combined Arms Command School alumni